İncirlik station is a railway station of Adana, located in the İncirlik quarter of the Yüreğir district. The station is served by two regional and one long-distance line.

External links
İncirlik Gar - Train Schedule

References

Transport in Adana
Buildings and structures in Adana
Railway stations in Adana Province
Railway stations opened in 1912
1912 establishments in the Ottoman Empire